Andrew Lamb (born 1 March 1978) is a New Zealand former cricketer who played for Central Districts and Wellington.

References

External links
 

1978 births
Living people
New Zealand cricketers
Central Districts cricketers
Wellington cricketers